Apobrata is a monotypic genus of Southeast Asian dwarf spiders containing the single species, Apobrata scutila. It was first described by J. A. Miller in 2004, and has only been found in the Philippines.

See also
 List of Linyphiidae species

References

Linyphiidae
Monotypic Araneomorphae genera
Spiders of Asia